To the Wild Country is a Canadian nature television miniseries which aired on CBC Television from 1972 to 1975.

Premise
Lorne Greene narrated and hosted this series of occasional specials which featured nature photographers John and Janet Foster in their exploration of the Canadian wilderness. Canada Trust was the primary series sponsor.

Reception
The series attracted average ratings of 2.5 million viewers, reaching 3.5 million on one occasion.

The series required substantial financial support due to the remote location filming. Canada Trust cancelled its sponsorship after the 1974–75 season.

Scheduling

This hour-long series was broadcast intermittently as follows (times in Eastern):

Further reading

References

External links
 
 

CBC Television original programming
1972 Canadian television series debuts
1975 Canadian television series endings
1970s Canadian documentary television series
Nature educational television series